The Yelm–Rainier–Tenino Trail, formerly the Yelm–Tenino Trail, is a rail trail located in Thurston County, Washington, United States.

Route
The trail runs parallel to State Route 507 and intersects with the southern end of the Chehalis Western Trail. Trailheads are located at the trail termini in Yelm and Tenino, with additional parking lots and entry points along the trail.

History
The trail, acquired by the county in 1993, has been constructed along the route of a former Burlington Northern Railroad line. Originally this section of railroad was named "The Prairie Line," but in 1986 the rail line from Yelm to Tenino was abandoned.

The trail was renamed in late 2021. Previously the "Yelm–Tenino Trail", the name now incorporates the city of Rainier, which maintains a portion of the trail that bisects the area and the city's limits.

The trail is used by bicyclists participating in the annual Seattle to Portland Bicycle Classic as they ride from Yelm to Tenino.

See also
 List of rail trails

References

External links
 Yelm-Tenino Trail
 Map of Trail
 History of The Prairie Line

Rail trails in Washington (state)
Protected areas of Thurston County, Washington
Tenino, Washington
Transportation in Thurston County, Washington